The 2016 Lafayette Leopards football team represented Lafayette College in the 2016 NCAA Division I FCS football season. They were led by 17th-year head coach Frank Tavani and played their home games at Fisher Stadium as members of the Patriot League. They finished the season 2–9, 1–5 to finish in sixth place.

On November 29, Tavani was fired, leaving Lafayette with a 17-year record of 84–107.

Schedule

Game summaries

at Central Connecticut

Delaware

at Princeton

Villanova

Holy Cross

at Fordham

at Army

at Bucknell

Georgetown

at Colgate

Lehigh

References

Lafayette
Lafayette Leopards football seasons
Lafayette Leopards football